Dwayne Anthony Mattis (born 31 July 1981) is a former professional footballer who played as a midfielder. Born in England, he made two appearances for the Republic of Ireland U21 national team.

Career
Mattis began his career as a trainee with Huddersfield Town, debuting on 1 May 1998 in the First Division match which Huddersfield drew 2–2 with Crystal Palace. Mattis came on as a 38th minute substitute for Jon Dyson.

Mattis played his second match - the final game of 1998–99 - eight days later, but did not play again until the second game of 2001–02, more than two years later. However, this was the breakthrough season for Mattis, who played a total of 29 league matches that season. Another full season followed, but in 2003–04 Mattis played only five games, including just one full match - the 6–2 defeat at Scunthorpe United.

Released at the season's end, Mattis joined Bury and made his debut on 7 August 2004 in the 3–1 home win over Yeovil Town. He has appeared regularly for the club since then.

Mattis has represented the Republic of Ireland at under-21 level.

On 10 January 2007, Mattis joined Barnsley after two unsuccessful bids despite offers from MK Dons. The final fee was £50,000 rising to £75,000 if Barnsley avoid relegation, plus a 20% sell on fee.

In September 2007 he signed for Walsall on a month-long loan deal but suffered a broken leg in a 0–0 draw with Tranmere Rovers and was sent back to Barnsley where he is expected to be out for three months.

Mattis was released by Barnsley on 30 June 2008, after having his contract terminated by mutual consent. On 3 July 2008, he signed a permanent contract with Walsall returning to the club he had a successful loan spell with during the previous season. He was released by Walsall on 10 May 2010 along with six other players. He signed a two-year deal with Chesterfield F.C. on 21 May 2010. He made a flying start to his Chesterfield career, scoring in his first three games against Barnet in the league, against Middlesbrough in the League Cup and Port Vale in the league.

Following an injury and subsequent operation, appearances in the first team were limited and in January 2012, his contract was cancelled by mutual consent. On 20 January 2012, he signed a contract until the end of the 2011–12 season with Macclesfield. In May 2012, Mattis was released by Macclesfield due to the expiry of his contract.

Honours
Chesterfield
Football League 2: 2010–11

References

External links

Official club profile from barnsleyfc.co.uk
Official club profile from buryfc.co.uk
Official club profile from saddlers.co.uk
Ireland stats at 11v11

1981 births
Living people
Footballers from Huddersfield
English footballers
English people of Irish descent
Republic of Ireland association footballers
Republic of Ireland under-21 international footballers
Association football midfielders
Huddersfield Town A.F.C. players
Bury F.C. players
Barnsley F.C. players
Walsall F.C. players
Chesterfield F.C. players
Macclesfield Town F.C. players
English Football League players